Justice Wilkins may refer to:

D. Frank Wilkins, associate justice of the Utah Supreme Court
Herbert P. Wilkins, chief justice of the Massachusetts Supreme Judicial Court
Michael J. Wilkins, associate justice of the Utah Supreme Court
Raymond Sanger Wilkins, associate justice of the Massachusetts Supreme Judicial Court

See also
Judge Wilkins (disambiguation)
Justice Wilkin (disambiguation)